Aleksandr Korolyov may refer to:

 Aleksandr Ivanovich Korolyov (born 1958), Transnistrian politician
 Aleksandr Petrovich Korolyov (born 1953), Russian football coach

See also
 Korolyov (disambiguation)